Nephroma is a genus of medium to large foliose lichens. The genus has a widespread distribution. They are sometimes called kidney lichens, named after the characteristic kidney-shaped apothecia that they produce on the lower surface of their lobe tips, which often curl upwards and thus are visible from above. Sterile specimens that do not have apothecia can look somewhat like Melanelia, Peltigera, Platismatia, or Asahinea.  Most species grow either on mossy ground or rocks, or on trees.

All species of Nephroma contain cyanobacteria (in the genus Nostoc) as a photobiont, which allows the organism to fix nitrogen.  In some species the cyanobacteria is the sole photobiont, while other species also contain a green alga photobiont (Coccomyxa) and the cyanobacteria is restricted to warty cephalodia on the upper or lower surface of the lichen.

Description
Species of Nephroma have a stratified foliose thallus with a cortex that is well-developed on both the upper and lower surfaces. The fruit bodies (apothecia) are formed on the lower surface of the thallus, which is later curved backward to expose the hymenium (spore-bearing surface). Initially, the ascomata are immersed with a vegetative covering that splits open at later stages of development. In contrast to all other groups of Peltigerales, the asci of Nephroma have neither a gelatinous coat nor an iodine-positive apical ring. The brown ascospores are elongated, and have a crosswise partition (septa). Reproductive structures called soredia, isidia, or lobules are present in most species.

Species

Nephroma arcticum 
Nephroma australe 
Nephroma bellum 
Nephroma cellulosum 
Nephroma expallidum 
Nephroma flavorhizinatum 
Nephroma helveticum 
Nephroma laevigatum 
Nephroma parile 
Nephroma resupinatum 
Nephroma rufum 
Nephroma subhelveticum 
Nephroma tangeriense

Uses

Several species of Nephroma are restricted to pristine, old growth forests, and thus are important indicator species that have already influenced some forest management decisions.  Nephroma occultum is listed as vulnerable in Canada by COSEWIC.

One species of Nephroma has been found to produce a brown dye, while another is recorded as being used in Scotland to produce a blue dye for wool.  Nephroma arcticum is called kusskoak by the Yup’ik of Alaska, and it is traditionally eaten after being boiled with crushed fish eggs.  A medicinal tea is also made from the lichen, and is reputed to be a powerful medicine to return strength to a person who is in a weak condition. N. arcticum contains several antifreeze proteins that have been patented by the Dutch multinational corporation Unilever for their ability to modify the growth of ice crystals; these proteins have been used to improve the texture of low-fat ice cream.

References

Lichen genera
Peltigerales
Taxa named by Erik Acharius
Peltigerales genera
Taxa described in 1810